Christiaan Nagel is a British street artist known for his oversized mushroom sculptures  made from polyurethane which he places high up on buildings. They stretch as far as London, New York, Barcelona, Berlin, Cape Town, Los Angeles

Early life and career

Nagel was born in South Africa and grew up in Durban. As a part of the Durban surfing community he participated as a member of this subculture of surf and skate for most of his life. Since his artistic beginnings, he attended art classes and one of his first accomplishments was ABSA Bank award for children that he was awarded when he was seven years old. In high school he worked and studied under the guidance of Scottish artist Fiona Kirkwood. During that period, he experimented with a range of popular mediums such as drawing, charcoal, painting and sculpting.

Notable works

One of his recent exhibitions is named “The FI of The Underworld” and it follows the story of metaphysical fish swimming through physical objects. It's all based on a mushroom trip, a hallucination.

He installed the Mega Mushroom, a 7 meter high sculpture at the Urban Spree Gallery in Berlin.

A second Mega Mushroom was installed on 24 May 2016 at the Red Gallery in Shoreditch, London.

In addition to mushrooms being a part of bigger narrative, he's working on a fantasy book that deals with subject of concept of perception, consciousness and dream content.  His dream is to build Mushroom Land. It will be a theme park that’ll provide a basis for his story and its characters, of course with mushrooms involved.

Aside from street art, Nagel is also a skilled musician, guitarist, composer and singer. He has designed his own guitar, "The Nail" which was built by German guitar builder, Jozsi Lak.

Collaborations

In February 2014,  Nagel teamed up with RUN and Sheffield-based artist Phlegm on a mission to give final moments of vivacious life to yet another to be demolished building in London - the Blithehale Medical Centre in Bethnal Green.

References

External links

Living people
Street artists
1982 births